THCA may refer to:
 THC-A, Tetrahydrocannabinolic acid
 T-HCA, trans-4-hydroxycrotonic acid